Onthophagus quadridentatus, is a species of dung beetle found in India, Sri Lanka, Pakistan and Taiwan.

Description
This broadly oval, medium convex species has an average length of about 6 to 8 mm. Body black, smooth and shiny. Elytra less shiny and the antennae and mouthparts are yellow. Tarsi are reddish in color. Dorsum lack hairs or setae but ventrum with very scanty yellow hairs. Head broad with medium-sized eyes. Pronotum finely and not closely punctured. Elytra strongly striate, and less strongly punctured. Pygidium opaque and finely and sparingly punctured. Male has smooth and shiny head with very fine and sparse punctures. Clypeus separated from forehead by a slight rounded carina. There is a backward, forming pair of short horns curving upward. Female has transversely rugose clypeus.

References 

Scarabaeinae
Insects of India
Beetles of Sri Lanka
Insects described in 1798